Soupha nouvongi is a species of beetle in the family Cerambycidae, and the only species in the genus Soupha. It was described by Breuning in 1963.

References

Desmiphorini
Beetles described in 1963
Monotypic beetle genera